The Hi-Jackers is a 1963 British crime thriller film written and directed by Jim O'Connolly. It stars Anthony Booth and Jacqueline Ellis. It was shot in black and white.

Plot
Long-distance independent lorry driver Terry (Anthony Booth) meets homeless and unemployed  Shirley (Jacqueline Ellis) at a truckers’ cafe and gives her a lift. His vehicle, carrying a valuable shipment of whisky, is then hijacked under cover of a fake road accident. Who tipped off the hijackers about the route Terry would take? Police Inspector Grayson (Patrick Cargill) and his team investigate.

Cast
 Anthony Booth as Terry McKinley
 Jacqueline Ellis as Shirley
 Derek Francis as Jack Carter
 Patrick Cargill as Inspector Grayson
 Glynn Edwards as Bluey
 David Gregory as Pete 
 Harold Goodwin as Scouse 
 Tony Wager as Smithy
 Arthur English as Bert
 Michael Beint as Forbes 
 Tommy Eytle as Sam Reynolds 
 Romo Gorrara as Joe 
 Ronald Hines as Jim Brady 
 Douglas Livingstone as Tim 
 Marianne Stone as Lil

Critical reception
The Radio Times wrote, "identifying the familiar British faces - Anthony Booth (Tony Blair's father-in-law), Patrick Cargill, Glynn Edwards - is the main point of interest in this very dated movie."

References

External links

1963 films
British crime thriller films
Films directed by Jim O'Connolly
British heist films
Trucker films
Butcher's Film Service films
1960s English-language films
1960s British films